Lo Vial is an underground metro station on the Line 2 of the Santiago Metro, in Santiago, Chile. The station was opened on 21 December 1978 as part of the extension of the line from Franklin to Lo Ovalle.

References

Santiago Metro stations
Santiago Metro Line 2